This is a list of windmills in the ceremonial county of  Oxfordshire, England.

Locations

Maps
1675 Ogilby
1675* Plott
1676 Ogilby
1715 Overton
1766 Jeffrey
1794 Richard Davis
1820 Townsend
1823 Bryant

Notes

Mills in bold are still standing, known building dates are indicated in bold. Text in italics denotes indicates that the information is not confirmed, but is likely to be the case stated.

Sources
Unless otherwise indicated, the source for all entries is

References

History of Oxfordshire

Oxfordshire
Windmills